Raigaun is a place name of  Makwanpur District that presently falls in  Bagmati rural municipality of province no 3 . It was a part of a village development committee  in  Narayani Zone of southern Nepal. At the time of the 1991 Nepal census it had a population of 9012 people living in 1468 individual households.

References

It is one of the municipality that lies in  Province number 3 of Nepal. It is formed by merging the three village development committee, that is Phaparbari , Raigaun and Betini.

Populated places in Makwanpur District

Raigaun≥≥ most popular are leaving in place